The Galore Creek project is one of the largest undeveloped copper-gold deposits in Canada and in the world. The deposit is located in northwestern British Columbia. The deposit, situated within an alkalic, silica-undersaturated igneous intrusive complex, has estimated metal contents of 12 billion pounds of copper, 10.7 million oz of gold and 183.1 million oz of silver. It was owned 50% by Teck Resources and 50% by NovaGold Resources until 2018, when Newmont purchased NovaGold's share.

The project is currently in care and maintenance status, managing critical safety, environmental and regulatory compliance activities.

References 

Gold mines in British Columbia
Copper mines in British Columbia
Regional District of Kitimat–Stikine
Teck Resources